Cowboys & Englishmen is the fourteenth studio album by the American country rock band Poco.  The Young-penned "Feudin'" was nominated for a Grammy in 1982 for Best Country Instrumental Performance. Largely made up of cover songs the album was Poco's last for MCA and reflected the fact that it was a contractual obligation album. When ABC Records was sold to MCA the new label A&R department showed little effort in promoting the band and, as a result, the band fielded offers from other labels once their contract was up and signed with Atlantic Records for their next two albums Ghost Town and Inamorata.

Reception

In his Allmusic review, music critic William Ruhlmann wrote, "A throwaway effort at a time when their career needed rejuvenation, not another wound. "

Track listing
"Sea of Heartbreak" (Paul Hampton, Hal David) – 3:44
"No Relief in Sight" (Rory Bourke, Eugene Dobbins, Johnny Wilson) – 3:10
"There Goes My Heart" (Paul Cotton) – 3:11
"Ashes" (Rusty Young, John Logan) – 2:59
"Feudin’" (Young) – 2:20
"Cajun Moon" (J.J. Cale) – 4:00
"Ribbon of Darkness" (Gordon Lightfoot) – 3:07
"If You Could Read My Mind" (Lynn Duddy & John Edwards) – 3:56
"While You're on Your Way" (Tim Hardin) – 3:44
"The Price of Love" (Don & Phil Everly) – 3:23

Personnel 
 Kim Bullard – keyboards, vocals
 Paul Cotton – guitars, vocals
 Rusty Young – steel guitar, guitars, vocals
 Charlie Harrison – bass, vocals
 Steve Chapman – drums

Production 
 Mike Flicker – producer 
 John Mills – engineer, mixing 
 Dave Marquette – assistant engineer 
 Mike Reese – mastering at The Mastering Lab (Hollywood, California).
 George Osaki – art direction 
 Bányai István – design, illustration
 Peter Golden – management 
 Bill Siddons – management 
 Crosslight Management Ltd. – management company

References

Poco albums
1982 albums
Albums produced by Mike Flicker
MCA Records albums